The Colossus Of Detroit is an album by jazz saxophonist Billy Mitchell, released in 1978 by Xanadu Records.

Reception

The Allmusic review by Scott Yanow stated "Veteran tenor saxophonist Billy Mitchell could not ask for a better rhythm section than he has here ... The results are quite boppish and one of Mitchell's better recordings of the past 20 years".

Track listing
 "Recorda-Me" (Joe Henderson) - 8:25
 "I Had the Craziest Dream" (Harry Warren, Mack Gordon) - 6:07
 "I Should Care" (Axel Stordahl, Paul Weston, Sammy Cahn) - 7:06
 "Unforgettable" (Irving Gordon) - 9:25
 "How Am I to Know?" (Jack King, Dorothy Parker) - 5:05
 "Be My Guest" (Fats Domino) - 6:08

Personnel 

 Billy Mitchell - saxophone
 Barry Harris - piano
 Sam Jones - bass
 Walter Bolden - drums

References

1978 albums
Billy Mitchell (jazz musician) albums
Xanadu Records albums
Albums produced by Don Schlitten